This is a list of seasons completed by the San Jose SaberCats. The SaberCats were a professional arena football franchise of the Arena Football League (AFL), based in San Jose, California. The team was established in 1995 and plays its home games at SAP Center at San Jose. The SaberCats won eight division championships, and were the winners of ArenaBowl XVI, ArenaBowl XVIII, and ArenaBowl XXI. Prior to the 2009 season, the AFL announced that it had suspended operations indefinitely and canceled the 2009 season. The SaberCats stated they "fully intended" to play in 2010, but ultimately did not. However, the team would return to play in 2011 along with several other resurrected franchises.  After the SaberCats winning the 2015 ArenaBowl with an overall record of 19-1, in November 2015 the AFL announced the team was ceasing operations for non-football related reasons.

References
General
 

Specific

Arena Football League seasons by team
San Jose SaberCats
San Jose, California-related lists
California sports-related lists